City Centre Fujairah  (Arabic: سيتي سنتر الفجيرة) is a shopping mall located in Fujairah City, Fujairah, United Arab Emirates, developed by Majid Al Futtaim Properties in partnership with the government-owned Fujairah Investment Establishment. City Centre Fujairah  opened in April 2012, and has  of retail space and includes 105 mid-market brands, 85% of which are new to Fujairah.

Entertainment
Magic Planet is a 1,325-square metre family entertainment centre that features the latest simulators, video games and theme rides for children.
VOX Cinemas is an 11- screen cinema offering high-resolution 4K digital projection. VOX Cinemas is the cinema arm of Majid Al Futtaim Ventures, a division of the Majid Al Futtaim Group, well known in the Middle East shopping mall and leisure sector.
Starbucks
Max 
Axiom
Centre Point

Environmental sustainability
City Centre Fujairah is a LEED-registered project and currently targeting a Gold LEED rating under the USGBC Green Building Guidelines as an eco-friendly building.

References

External links
 City Centre Fujairah website
 

2012 establishments in the United Arab Emirates
Shopping malls established in 2012
Shopping malls in the United Arab Emirates
Buildings and structures in the Emirate of Fujairah
Economy of the Emirate of Fujairah
Fujairah City